The official results of the Men's 20 kilometres walk at the 1976 Summer Olympics in Montreal, Quebec, Canada, held on Friday July 23, 1976. A total number of thirty-six athletes completed the race, while two of them did not finish.

Final ranking

References

M
Racewalking at the Olympics
Men's events at the 1976 Summer Olympics